Auburn is a village on the Isis River, in the parish of Hill and county of Somerset, Tasmania. Nearby is the remarkable hill called Jacob's Sugar Loaf.

References

Midlands (Tasmania)
Populated places established in the 19th century
Towns in Tasmania